is a Japanese set decorator. He was nominated for the Academy Award for Best Art Direction along with So Matsuyama for their work in Rashomon (1950).

References

External links

Japanese set decorators
Year of birth missing
Year of death missing
Place of birth missing
Place of death missing